Falling for Korea - Transnational Couples is a South Korean show. One of the runners-up of the 2021 MBN Entertainment Program Creation Contest, It premiered on MBN's Friday late prime time slot (11 PM KST) on May 28, 2021.

Format 
Falling for Korea - Transnational Couples invites international families living in Korea to open up about their experiences, their love of Korea, as well as some of their daily hacks about transnational marriages.

Host 
 Kim Won-hee (Seasons 1 and 2)
 Kim Hee-chul (Season 1)
 Yoon Shi-yoon (Season 2)

Panel 
 Joon Park
 Kim Jung-min
 Alberto Mondi
 Jung Ju-Ri
 Kim Ye-ryeong

International wife

List of episodes 

References 

2021 South Korean television series debuts
2021 South Korean television series endings
Korean-language television shows